Ana Celia de Armas Caso (born 30 April 1988) is a Cuban and Spanish  actress. She began her career in Cuba and had a leading role in the romantic drama Una rosa de Francia (2006). At age 18, she moved to Madrid, Spain, and starred in the popular drama El internado for six seasons from 2007 to 2010.

After moving to Los Angeles, de Armas had English-speaking roles in the psychological thriller Knock Knock (2015) and the comedy-crime film War Dogs (2016), and had a supporting role in the sports biopic Hands of Stone (2016). She rose to prominence with her role as the holographic AI projections Joi in the science fiction film Blade Runner 2049 (2017). For her performance as nurse Marta Cabrera in the mystery film Knives Out (2019), she was nominated for a Golden Globe Award for Best Actress. She subsequently portrayed Bond girl Paloma in the  film No Time to Die (2021) and Marilyn Monroe in the fictional biopic Blonde (2022). For the latter, de Armas received a nomination for the Academy Award for Best Actress, becoming the first Cuban woman to do so.

Early life
De Armas was born in Havana, Cuba, and raised in the small city of Santa Cruz del Norte. Her maternal grandparents were migrants to Cuba from Spain. Her father Ramón worked in various jobs, including bank manager, teacher, school principal and deputy mayor of a town. He previously studied philosophy at a Soviet university. Her mother Ana worked in the human resources section of the Ministry of Education. De Armas has one older brother, Javier, a New York-based photographer who, in 2020, was questioned by Cuban police due to his critical stance on Decree 349 and his links to artists under government surveillance. While de Armas grew up with food rationing, fuel shortages and electricity blackouts during Cuba's Special Period, she has described her early life as happy.

During her childhood and adolescence, de Armas had no internet access and had limited knowledge of popular culture beyond Cuba. She was allowed to watch "20 minutes of cartoons on Saturday and the Sunday movie matinee." Her family did not own a "video or DVD player" and she watched Hollywood movies in her neighbor's apartment. She memorized and practiced monologues in front of a mirror, and decided to become an actress when she was 12. In 2002, aged 14, she successfully auditioned to join Havana's National Theatre of Cuba. She sometimes hitchhiked to attend the "rigorous" course. While a student, she filmed three movies. She left the four-year drama course months before presenting her final thesis because Cuban graduates are forbidden from leaving the country without completing three years of mandatory service to the community. At age 18, with Spanish citizenship through her maternal grandparents, she moved to Madrid to pursue an acting career.

Career

Career beginnings in Spanish cinema (2006–2013)

In her native Cuba, de Armas had a starring role opposite Álex González in Manuel Gutiérrez Aragón's romantic drama Una rosa de Francia (2006). Cuban actor Jorge Perugorría suggested that the director consider de Armas for the role, after meeting her while attending a birthday party with his daughters. The director visited de Armas's drama school and interrupted the sixteen-year-old during her audition to inform her that the role was hers. She travelled to Spain as part of a promotional tour for the film and was introduced to Juan Lanja, who would later become her Spanish agent. She then starred in the movie El edén perdido (2007) and had a supporting role in Fernando Pérez's Madrigal (2007), filmed at night without the permission of her drama school tutors.

At age 18, de Armas moved to Madrid. Within two weeks of arriving, she met with casting director Luis San Narciso, who had seen her in Una rosa de Francia. Two months later, he cast her as Carolina in the drama El Internado, in which she starred for six seasons from 2007 to 2010. The television show, set in a boarding school, became popular with viewers and made de Armas a celebrity figure in Spain. In a break from filming, she starred in the successful coming-of-age comedy Mentiras y Gordas (2009). Despite the popularity of El Internado, de Armas felt typecast and was mainly offered roles as youngsters. She asked to be written out of the show in its second to last season. 

After spending a few months living in New York City to learn English, de Armas was persuaded to return to Spain to star in seventeen episodes of the historical drama Hispania (2010–2011). She then starred in Antonio Trashorras's horror films El callejón (2011) and Anabel (2015), and in the drama Por un puñado de besos (2014). During a long period without acting work, de Armas participated in workshops at Tomaz Pandur's Madrid theatre company and felt "very anxious" about the lack of momentum in her career.

Transition to Hollywood and breakthrough (2014–2020)
With encouragement from her newly hired Hollywood agent, she decided to move to Los Angeles. When de Armas first arrived in Los Angeles in 2014, she had to start her career again "from scratch." She spoke very little English and, during early auditions, she often "didn't even know what [she] was saying." She spent four months in full-time education to learn English, not wanting to be confined to playing characters written specifically for Latina actresses. She starred opposite Keanu Reeves in her first Hollywood release—Eli Roth's erotic thriller Knock Knock (2015)—and learned her lines phonetically. Despite giving a positive review of the film, Randy Cordova of the Arizona Republic found de Armas to be "unconvincing" in her role. Reeves then telephoned de Armas to invite her to star in a Spanish-language role in the thriller Daughter of God which he acted in and produced. Producer Mark Downie hoped the film would be a star vehicle for de Armas, but due to executive meddling Daughter of God was severely edited with de Armas' former starring role reduced. The film was ultimately released as Exposed in 2016. Frank Scheck of The Hollywood Reporter noted that while she was "appealing" in her part, de Armas was unable to demonstrate her "character's intense emotional demands."

De Armas had a supporting role in Todd Phillips's War Dogs (2016), acting opposite Miles Teller as the wife of an arms dealer, and again learned her lines phonetically. David Ehrlich of IndieWire found her to be "memorable in a thankless role". She starred opposite Édgar Ramírez in the biopic Hands of Stone (2016) as the wife of Panamanian boxer Roberto Durán. Despite its delayed release, Hands of Stone was the first Hollywood film de Armas had filmed. She was contacted by director Jonathan Jakubowicz while still living in Madrid after watching her in El Internado and asked her to travel to Los Angeles to audition for the Spanish-language part. In reviewing the film, Christy Lemire of RogerEbert.com described de Armas as "a hugely charismatic presence. But except for a couple of showy moments, she gets little to do besides function as the dutiful wife."

In Denis Villeneuve's futuristic thriller Blade Runner 2049 (2017), de Armas had a supporting role as Joi, the holographic AI girlfriend of Ryan Gosling's character, a blade runner. Mark Kermode of The Guardian said she "brings three-dimensional warmth to a character who is essentially a digital projection." Anthony Lane of The New Yorker found her to be "wondrous": "Whenever Joi appears, the movie's imaginative heart begins to race." While the performance was initially discussed as a breakthrough role, the film underperformed commercially, and de Armas spent much of the following year in her native Cuba, where she purchased a house. Also in 2017, she had a supporting role in the action thriller Overdrive as the love interest to Scott Eastwood's character. Stephen Dalton of The Hollywood Reporter wrote that she "radiates more kick-ass charisma than her thankless sidekick role might suggest."

In 2018, de Armas starred opposite Demián Bichir in John Hillcoat's medical drama Corazón. She played a Dominican woman with heart failure in the short film, funded by Montefiore Medical Center to raise awareness of organ donation. While de Armas's scenes opposite Himesh Patel in the 2019 romantic comedy Yesterday were included in the film's trailer, they were cut from the final product. The director Danny Boyle said that, while de Armas was "really radiant" in her scenes, the introduction of a love triangle subplot did not test well with audiences.

De Armas's role as an immigrant nurse in the ensemble murder mystery film Knives Out (2019), written and directed by Rian Johnson, was widely praised and marked a breakthrough for the actress. When first approached about the project, she was unenthusiastic about the idea of playing a stereotypical "Latina caretaker" but soon realized that her character was "so much more than that." Tom Shone of The Times remarked, "The film's standout performance comes from its least well-known member, the Cuban de Armas, who manages the difficult task of making goodness interesting." Benjamin Lee of The Guardian said her "striking" performance left a "lasting impression." The film was a major box office success. De Armas was nominated for the Golden Globe Award for Best Actress – Motion Picture Comedy or Musical with her also winning the Saturn Award for Best Supporting Actress and the National Board of Review Award for Best Cast with the cast.

De Armas starred in four films released in the United States in 2020. She had a supporting role in the crime thriller The Informer as the wife of Joel Kinnaman's character. Guy Lodge of Variety found "her thin role all the more glaring in the wake of her Knives Out stardom." She appeared as a femme fatale in the noir crime drama The Night Clerk. Brian Tallerico of RogerEbert.com said the film had "no idea" what to do with her "blinding charisma" while Katie Rife of The AV Club remarked that it would be remembered, "if at all, as a movie de Armas was way too good for." She starred opposite Wagner Moura in the Netflix biopic Sergio (2020) as Carolina Larriera, a U.N. official and the partner of diplomat Sérgio Vieira de Mello. John DeFore of The Hollywood Reporter found her "magnetic" while Jessica Kiang of Variety said she imbued the part "with an intelligence and will that makes her more than just de Mello's romantic foil." De Armas reunited with Moura to play the wife of one of the Cuban Five in Olivier Assayas's Netflix spy thriller Wasp Network. The film was shot on location in Cuba; it was de Armas's first work in her home country since leaving as a teenager. Glenn Kenny of The New York Times found her "superb" while Jay Weissberg of Variety described her as "a joyous, bewitching presence whose career seems destined for the big time."

Leading roles and further recognition (2021–present)
In 2021, de Armas reunited with Daniel Craig to play a Bond girl in Cary Joji Fukunaga's No Time to Die. Fukunaga wrote the character of a Cuban CIA agent with de Armas in mind. She described the character as bubbly and "very irresponsible". In her short appearance in No Time to Die, her character, Paloma, claimed to have little training but proved to be highly skilled. No Time to Die was a commercial success, grossing $774.2 million worldwide, and earned positive reviews. Peter Bradshaw of The Guardian praised de Armas' "witty and unworldly turn". De Armas starred in Adrian Lyne's erotic thriller Deep Water, based upon the novel by Patricia Highsmith. She and Ben Affleck play a couple in an open marriage. In 2022, De Armas starred in the Russo brothers' Netflix action thriller The Gray Man, alongside Ryan Gosling and Chris Evans. Neither Deep Water nor The Gray Man were particularly successful with critics and audiences. 

De Armas portrayed Marilyn Monroe in the Netflix biopic Blonde (2022), based on the biographical fiction novel of the same name by Joyce Carol Oates. Director Andrew Dominik noticed de Armas's performance in Knock Knock and, while she went through a long casting process, Dominik secured the role for her after the first audition. In preparation, de Armas worked with a dialect coach for a year, read Oates' novel and also said she studied hundreds of photographs, videos, audio recordings, and films to prepare for the role. Despite criticism towards her casting, due to her having a notable Spanish accent, de Armas' performance was praised; Catherine Bray of Empire labeled de Armas' performance as "powerful", while Richard Lawson of Vanity Fair remarked that "De Armas is fiercely, almost scarily committed to the role, maintaining high and focused energy through every torrent of tears and screams and traumas." She received nominations for the Academy Award for Best Actress, the BAFTA Award for Best Actress in a Leading Role, the Golden Globe Award for Best Actress in a Motion Picture – Drama and the Screen Actors Guild Award for Outstanding Performance by a Female Actor in a Leading Role.

De Armas will next star in the Apple TV+ film Ghosted, also starring Chris Evans, for which she replaced Scarlett Johansson.

Personal life
De Armas began a relationship with Spanish actor Marc Clotet in mid-2010 and they married in Costa Brava  in July 2011. They divorced in early 2013. She was briefly engaged to American talent agent Franklin Latt during a relationship from early 2015 to late 2016. After meeting on the set of Deep Water in late 2019, de Armas dated American actor Ben Affleck from March 2020 to January 2021.

De Armas holds dual Cuban and Spanish citizenship. She moved to Los Angeles at 26, and resides in Vermont as of 2023.

Filmography

Film

Television

Music videos

Awards and nominations

References

External links

 
 
 
 

1988 births
Living people
Actresses from Havana
Cuban film actresses
Spanish film actresses
Cuban television actresses
Spanish television actresses
Cuban people of Spanish descent
Cuban expatriates in the United States
Cuban expatriates in Spain
Citizens of Spain through descent
21st-century Cuban actresses
21st-century Spanish actresses